The 2007 Hansol Korea Open was a women's tennis tournament and was held from September 24–30, 2007, in Seoul, South Korea. It was a WTA Tour Tier-IV event.

Points and prize money

Point distribution

Prize money

* per team

Singles main-draw entrants

Seeds

Other entrants 

The following players received wildcards into the singles main draw:
  Han Sung-hee  
  Kim So-jung
  Lee Ye-ra

The following players received entry from the qualifying draw:
  Marta Domachowska
  Junri Namigata
  Abigail Spears  
  Marina Erakovic

Retirements
  Ágnes Szávay (left thigh injury)

Doubles main-draw entrants

Seeds

Other entrants 
The following pairs received wildcards into the doubles main draw:
  Cho Yoon-jeong /  Kim Jin-hee

The following pairs received entries as alternates into the doubles main draw:
  Courtney Nagle /  Robin Stephenson

Retirements 
Before the tournament:
  Anne Keothavong (hip injury)

During the tournament:
  Séverine Brémond (upper leg strain)

Finals

Singles

 Venus Williams defeated  Maria Kirilenko 6–3, 1–6, 6–4

Doubles

 Chuang Chia-jung /  Hsieh Su-wei defeated  Eleni Daniilidou /  Jasmin Wöhr 6–2, 6–2
This was Chuang Chia-jung's second consecutive title with Hsieh Su-wei.

References

External links
 WTA tournament info
 ITF tournament info

Hansol Korea Open
Korea Open (tennis)
Korea